Bruno Zimm may refer to:
 Bruno H. Zimm, American chemist
 Bruno Zimm (artist), American sculptor